Yu Xiaohui (born 1949) is a Chinese novelist. Yu is a member of the Chinese Communist Party and China Writers Association. She shared the Mao Dun Literature Prize with her husband Sun Li in 1991.

Biography
Yu was born in Shanghai in 1949. She worked in Heilongjiang Production and Construction Corps in 1968. She graduated from Tianjin Normal University in 1974. After graduation, Yu worked in Tianjin Art Academy and Tianjin College of Traditional Chinese Medicine as a teacher. Yu started to publish novels in 1981. She joined the China Writers Association in 1991.

Works

Novels
 Rhapsody of Metropolis (co-author: Sun Li)
 English translation: Metropolis translated by David Kwan. Beijing: Panda Books, 1992.
 Wishing We Last Forever (co-author: Sun Li)

Awards
 Rhapsody of Metropolis – 3rd Mao Dun Literature Prize (1991)

Personal life
Yu married novelist Sun Li, they co-wrote the novels Rhapsody of Metropolis and Wishing We Last Forever.

References

1949 births
Tianjin Normal University alumni
Writers from Shanghai
Living people
Chinese women novelists
Mao Dun Literature Prize laureates